Petuntse (from ,), also spelled petunse and bai dunzi, baidunzi, is a historic term for a wide range of micaceous or feldspathic rocks. However, all will have been subject to geological alteration of igneous rocks that result in materials which, after processing, are suitable as an ingredient in some ceramic formulations. The name means "little white bricks", referring to the form in which it was transported to the potteries (compare ball clay).

It was, and to some extent continues to be, an important raw material for porcelain. The name Pottery stone is now used. The alternative name of Porcelain stone is occassionlly used. 

According to one source, it is mixed with kaolin in proportions varying according to the grade of porcelain to be produced; equal quantities for the best and two thirds petuntse to one third kaolin for everyday ware. There were large deposits of high-quality stone in Jiangxi province in south-eastern China, which became a centre for porcelain production, especially in Jingdezhen ware.

Non-Chinese pottery stones

Similar material is found, and used, in Japan, Korea and Thailand.

China stone, which is found uniquely in southwestern England, shares some similarities to Asian pottery stones, although there are differences in mineralogy. Relatively similar material to China stone has been mined, and exported to England for ceramics use, in the Isle of Man and Jersey.

References

Further reading
Macintosh, D., Chinese Blue and White Porcelain, 3rd ed., 1994, Antique Collectors' Club, 
Rose Kerr, Joseph Needham, Nigel Wood, Science and Civilisation in China: Volume 5, Chemistry and Chemical Technology, Part 12, Ceramic Technology, 2004, Cambridge University Press, google books
Rawson, Jessica (ed). The British Museum Book of Chinese Art, 2007 (2nd edn), British Museum Press, 
Vainker, S.J., Chinese Pottery and Porcelain, 1991, British Museum Press, 

Chinese porcelain
Ceramic materials